The 1999 Tennessee Titans season was the franchise’s 40th season and their 30th in the National Football League (NFL). It was the first year for the team under the name “Titans”, while the nickname “Oilers” was retired by the NFL. The Titans became the seventh Wild Card team to qualify for the Super Bowl. However, after defeating the Bills, Colts, and Jaguars in the postseason, they lost the Super Bowl to the St. Louis Rams, 23–16 on a famous last-second tackle made by Rams defender Mike Jones at the goal line that prevented Titans receiver Kevin Dyson from scoring a potential game-tying touchdown. The highlight of the season was the Wild Card game against the Buffalo Bills, dubbed the Music City Miracle. In the game's closing seconds, Kevin Dyson caught a lateral on a kickoff and ran all the way down the sidelines for a touchdown. Also notable is the fact that the Titans were the only team to beat the Jaguars in 1999, as the latter finished 14–2 and lost both games to the Titans, and would lose the AFC Championship Game to the Titans as well.

With the sixteenth pick of the 1999 NFL Draft, the Titans selected defensive end Jevon Kearse of Florida; he had his best years in Tennessee, being named to three consecutive Pro Bowls (1999–2001).

Offseason

NFL Draft

Personnel

Staff

Roster

Preseason

Schedule

Regular season

Schedule

Standings

Game Summaries

Week 1 vs. Cincinnati Bengals

In the team’s inaugural game as the “Titans”, Steve McNair threw two touchdowns and ran in a third for a 26–15 lead with 2:55 left in the first half, but a Jeff Blake touchdown left the halftime score 26–21 Titans.  The Bengals stormed to a 35–26 lead in the fourth before McNair connected with Eddie George for a 17-yard touchdown with 4:30 left in the fourth, then Al Del Greco kicked the game-winning 33-yard field goal of a 36–35 Titans final.

Week 2 vs. Cleveland Browns

Week 3 at Jacksonville Jaguars

Neil O'Donnell was forced to start, and he threw a third-quarter touchdown to Eddie George, but an Aaron Beasley interception became a 35-yard Jaguars score and a 17–7 Jacksonville lead.  O'Donnell rebounded with a fourth-quarter score to Michael Roan and a 20–19 Titans win as Tennessee surrendered a safety on the game’s final play.

Week 4 at San Francisco 49ers

Tennessee suffered its first loss of the year as Jeff Garcia ran in a one-yard touchdown, then connected with Terrell Owens in the fourth quarter.  The Titans trailed 24–16 when O'Donnell hit Yancey Thigpen in the end zone with 2:48 left in regulation; the two-point try was stopped, however, and the Niners ran out the clock for a 24–22 Titans loss.

Week 5 vs. Baltimore Ravens

The Titans committed the highest penalty yardage in league history to that point with fifteen fouls eating up 212 yards; the Ravens, under first-year coach Brian Billick, didn’t fare much better with nine penalties for 81 yards. Titans starter Neil O'Donnell completed 24 of 35 passes for 216 yards and a 27-yard score to Yancey Thigpen while Eddie George was limited to just 55 rushing yards.

Week 8 vs. St. Louis Rams

In a Super Bowl XXXIV precursor, Steve McNair threw two touchdowns and ran in a third in the first quarter, then the Titans sweated out three Kurt Warner touchdown throws for a 24–21 win. The Rams coughed up three fumbles to the Titans.

Week 11 vs. Pittsburgh Steelers

Week 14 vs. Oakland Raiders

Week 15 vs. Atlanta Falcons

Week 16 vs. Jacksonville Jaguars

The Jaguars had beaten every team on their 1999 slate except the Titans, but the Titans finished a season sweep with a 41–14 rout.  Steve McNair exploded to five touchdowns and 328 passing yards while Eddie George ran wild with 102 rushing yards. The Titans defense limited Jaguars quarterbacks Mark Brunell and Jay Fiedler to 196 combined yards and three interceptions.

Week 17 at Pittsburgh Steelers

The Titans erupted to six touchdowns, a 42-yard Al Del Greco field goal, and a safety after sacking Mike Tomczak in the Pittsburgh end zone for a 47–36 triumph.  Jevon Kearse and Denard Walker scored off Steeler fumbles while Steve McNair and former Steeler Neil O'Donnell combined for 203 passing yards and three touchdowns.  Tomczak had two touchdown throws while Jerome Bettis and Richard Huntley each ran in a Pittsburgh touchdown.

Playoffs

AFC Wild Card

Music City Miracle

The Music City Miracle is a famous play in the NFL Wild Card Playoffs involving the Titans and Buffalo Bills that took place on January 8, 2000 (following the 1999 regular season) at Adelphia Coliseum in Nashville, Tennessee.

Going into the game, Bills coach Wade Phillips created a stir by starting quarterback Rob Johnson, rather than Doug Flutie, who had started 15 games, and who had led the team to the playoffs. Late in the fourth quarter, the stage was set for an exciting finish. Tennessee received the ball with 6:15 remaining. Titans receiver Isaac Byrd’s 16-yard punt return and five carries from Eddie George for 17 yards set up a wobbly 36-yard field goal by kicker Al Del Greco. The Titans took a 15–13 lead with 1:48 to go.

On the ensuing drive, with no timeouts remaining, Bills quarterback Johnson led the Bills on a five-play, 37-yard drive to the Titans' 24-yard line. On the last two plays from scrimmage, Johnson played with only one shoe on, as he had lost one during a scramble, and had no time to put it back on, with the clock running out. With only 16 seconds remaining in the game, Steve Christie, the Bills' kicker, made a 41-yard field goal to put Buffalo in the lead, 16–15.

Moments later, Christie kicked off, and Titans fullback Lorenzo Neal received. Neal handed the ball off to Titans tight end Frank Wycheck, who then lateraled the ball across the field to another Titans player, Kevin Dyson, who then ran down the sidelines for a 75-yard touchdown. The play was named Home Run Throwback by the Titans and was developed by Special Teams Coordinator Alan Lowry.

 Official review
Per the instant replay rules, the play was reviewed by referee Phil Luckett since it was uncertain if the ball had been a forward pass, which is illegal on a kickoff return.  However, the call on the field was upheld as a touchdown, and the Titans won the game 22–16.  After the game, however, many Bills players and fans continued to insist that it was indeed an illegal forward pass.

AFC Divisional Playoff

Although the Indianapolis Colts, behind second year quarterback Peyton Manning, had posted some gaudy numbers (3rd in points scored compared to Tennessee’s 7th) en route to a sterling 13–3 regular season record, the upstart Titans paid them little respect. Running back Eddie George rushed for a team playoff-record 162 yards, including a 68-yard touchdown, to help lead the Titans to victory.  Manning completed only 19 of 43 passes in the loss for the Colts.

AFC Championship Game

The Jacksonville Jaguars had been one of the NFL’s best teams in the 1999 season; they were 6th in scoring and first in fewest points allowed while pacing the AFC with a 14–2 record. However, both of those losses came at the hands of their opponents in the AFC Championship game, the Tennessee Titans. The Titans would prove up to the task of beating their division rival once again as the Titans scored a resounding 33–14 victory; the game was at times a chaotic affair as the Titans forced six turnovers and an end zone sack for a safety, all despite giving up four turnovers themselves; the Jaguars were also bullied into nine penalties for 100 yards.   The Titans advanced to the first Super Bowl in club history.

Super Bowl XXXIV
The Titans took over the ball at their own 10-yard line with 1:54 left in the game after committing a holding penalty on the ensuing kickoff. McNair started out the drive with a pair of completions to Mason and Wycheck for gains of 9 and 7 yards to reach the 28-yard line. Then after throwing an incompletion, defensive back Dre' Bly’s 15-yard facemask penalty while tackling McNair on a 12-yard scramble gave the Titans a first down at the St. Louis 45-yard line. On the next play, St. Louis was penalized 5 yards for being offsides, moving the ball to the 40-yard line with 59 seconds left. McNair then ran for 2 yards, followed by a 7-yard completion to wide receiver Kevin Dyson. Three plays later, with the Titans facing 3rd down and 5 to go, McNair was hit by two Rams' defenders, but he escaped and completed a 16-yard pass to Dyson to gain a first down at the Rams 10-yard line. Tennessee then used up their final timeout with just 6 seconds left in the game, giving them a chance for one last play. McNair threw a short pass to Kevin Dyson down the middle, which looked certain to tie up the game, until Rams linebacker Mike Jones tackled Dyson at the one-yard line as time expired. Dyson tried to stretch his arm and the football across the goal line, but he had already gone down, so it was too late. This final play has gone down in NFL history as simply "The Tackle".

After the game, many sports writers commented on Warner’s rise from an unknown backup to a Super Bowl MVP, but Warner himself wasn't impressed by it. "How can you be in awe of something that you expect yourself to do?" Warner pointed out. "People think this season is the first time I touched a football; they don't realize I've been doing this for years – just not on this level, because I never got the chance. Sure, I had my tough times, but you don't sit there and say, 'Wow, I was stocking groceries five years ago, and look at me now.' You don't think about it, and when you do achieve something, you know luck has nothing to do with it."

Scoring summary
 STL – FG: Jeff Wilkins 27 yards 3–0 STL
 STL – FG: Jeff Wilkins 29 yards 6–0 STL
 STL – FG: Jeff Wilkins 28 yards 9–0 STL
 STL – TD: Torry Holt, 9-yard pass from Warner (Jeff Wilkins kick) 16–0 STL
 TEN – TD: Eddie George 1-yard run (2-pt conv: pass failed) 16–6 STL
 TEN – TD: Eddie George 2-yard run (Al Del Greco kick) 16–13 STL
 TEN – FG: Al Del Greco 43 yards 16–16 tie
 STL – TD: Isaac Bruce 73-yard pass from Kurt Warner (Jeff Wilkins kick) 23–16 STL

References

External links
 1999 Tennessee Titans at Pro-Football-Reference.com

Tennessee Titans
Tennessee Titans seasons
American Football Conference championship seasons
Tennessee Titans